Africallagma subtile is a species of damselfly in the family Coenagrionidae. It is found in Botswana, the Republic of the Congo, the Democratic Republic of the Congo, Ethiopia, Guinea, Kenya, Malawi, Mozambique, Namibia, Nigeria, Senegal, Sierra Leone, Tanzania, Uganda, Zambia, Zimbabwe, and possibly Burundi. Its natural habitats are subtropical or tropical dry and moist lowland forests, dry and moist savanna, subtropical or tropical dry shrubland, intermittent rivers, shrub-dominated wetlands, swamps, and marshes.

References

Coenagrionidae
Odonata of Africa
Insects described in 1921
Taxonomy articles created by Polbot